Matamata was a New Zealand parliamentary electorate in the Waikato, from 1978 to 1996. It was a rural and safe National electorate, held by Jack Luxton from 1978 to 1987, and then by his son John Luxton from 1987 to 1996.

Population centres
The 1977 electoral redistribution was the most overtly political since the Representation Commission had been established through an amendment to the Representation Act in 1886, initiated by Muldoon's National Government. As part of the 1976 census, a large number of people failed to fill out an electoral re-registration card, and census staff had not been given the authority to insist on the card being completed. This had little practical effect for people on the general roll, but it transferred Māori to the general roll if the card was not handed in. Together with a northward shift of New Zealand's population, this resulted in five new electorates having to be created in the upper part of the North Island. The electoral redistribution was very disruptive, and 22 electorates were abolished, while 27 electorates were newly created (including Matamata) or re-established. Matamata was a rural Waikato electorate, formed from the former  electorate in 1978. In 1996 for the first MMP election, the enlarged electorate was renamed .

The original electorate included the following population centres: Morrinsville, Matamata, Cambridge, and Putāruru.

History
In the 1978 election, the Matamata electorate was won by National's Jack Luxton, who had been MP for the Piako electorate since . When the Matamata electorate was abolished in 1996, Luxton successfully stood in the Karapiro electorate.

Members of Parliament
Key

Notes

References

Historical electorates of New Zealand
1978 establishments in New Zealand
1996 disestablishments in New Zealand